Diablophis is a genus of Late Jurassic stem-snake from the Morrison Formation of North America. The type and only species, D. gilmorei was once thought to be a species of Parviraptor but is now classified as its own genus. The animal is known from multiple specimens, the holotype being LACM 4684/140572, which consists of a broken right mandible, broken right maxilla and broken axis vertebrae. A number of other specimens have also been attributed to Diablophis, including LACM 4684/140572 and LACM 5572/120732, the specimens previously attributed to Parviraptor and LACM 4684/120472.

Phylogeny 
Diablophis has been recovered as a basal snake, though this placement is not undisputed. The cladogram from figure 4b in Caldwell et al.'s 2015 study is replicated below.

References 

Prehistoric snakes
Prehistoric reptile genera
Jurassic reptiles of North America
Morrison fauna
Fossil taxa described in 2015